Mohammed Sahil (born 11 October 1963) is a Moroccan football midfielder who played for Morocco in the 1986 FIFA World Cup.

Career
After finishing college, Sahil began playing senior football with WAC Casablanca during the 1982–83 Botola season. After three seasons with WAC, Sahil joined KAC Marrakech, but returned to WAC after one season with Marrakech. In 1987, Sahil signed his first professional contract, with France's Ligue 2 side Louhans-Cuiseaux FC. Later, he played professionally in the Portuguese Segunda Divisão B with C.D.R. Quarteirense.

Sahil made several appearances for the Morocco national football team. He helped the team qualify for the 1986 African Cup of Nations, and scored a headed goal in the third place match at the finals.

References

External links
FIFA profile

1963 births
Moroccan footballers
Moroccan expatriate footballers
Morocco international footballers
Association football midfielders
Botola players
Ligue 2 players
Wydad AC players
Kawkab Marrakech players
Louhans-Cuiseaux FC players
C.D.R. Quarteirense players
Expatriate footballers in France
Expatriate footballers in Portugal
Moroccan expatriate sportspeople in France
Moroccan expatriate sportspeople in Portugal
1986 African Cup of Nations players
1986 FIFA World Cup players
Living people